is a 1978 Japanese anime fantasy film produced by Toei Animation and Tezuka Productions based on the fairy tale of the same name by Hans Christian Andersen. The film was first shown in Japan on 18 March 1978 in the Toei Manga Matsuri ('Toei Cartoon Festival'). The film sees "Father of Manga" Ozamu Tezuka as character designer and art director, and former Mushi Production's animator Kazuko Nakamura as assistant animation director upon Tezuka's recommendation.

It represents the second entry in Toei's World Masterpiece Fairy Tales movie series, preceded by The Wild Swans (1977) and followed by Twelve Months (1980), Swan Lake (1981) and Aladdin and the Wonderful Lamp (1982). It is also the fourth Toei film to be based on Andersen's works, after The World of Hans Christian Andersen (1968), Hans Christian Andersen's The Little Mermaid (1975) and the already mentioned The Wild Swans.

Plot 
Thumbelina, a girl no bigger than a thumb, is born from a tulip and raised by a childless lady. One day while she's playing with her best friend Buzzer the beetle, Thumbelina meets the Prince of Tulips who falls in love with her and rename her Maya. That same evening she is kidnapped by two frogs who want to give her in marriage to their son. But the young frog, moved to pity lets Thumbelina go away with Buzzer. With the arrival of winter she finds shelter underground in the lair of the kind mouse Mrs. Chumi. Here Thumbelina catches the attention of Mr Mogul, a rich mole who asks for her hand in marriage. After various hardships, with the help of a swallow Thumbelina will be able to find the prince she was looking so much for.

Voice Cast

Additional Voices 

 Sanji Hase (はせさん治), Rihoko Yoshida (吉田理保子), Michiko Nomura (野村道子), Keiko Yamamoto (山本圭子), Masako Saito (斉藤昌子)

Music 
The songs were composed by Shunsuke Kikuchi and performed by Columbia Orchestra, while lyrics were written by Etsuko Bushika.

 "Always in a Dream" (ゆめでいつでも, Yume de itsu demo) (Singers: Kumiko Ōsugi and The Will Beads)
 "Gekogeko Song" (ゲコゲコソング, Gekogeko songu) (Singers: Kyoko Kishida and The Aoni Trio)

International releases 
Like The Wild Swans, the film was dubbed in English in 1983 by Sound Shop Inc. in New York under the direction of Peter Fernandez, and released by Turner Program Services. The movie was later released on VHS in 1984 by RCA Columbia Pictures Home Video. The movie was also released in Spanish, French, Italian, German, Hungarian, Polish, Russian and Arabic.

References

External links 

 Official English webpage from Toei Animation
 
 Thumbelina at FilmAffinity
 Thumbelina at The Big Cartoon DataBase
 

1978 anime films
Japanese animated fantasy films
Toei Animation films
Films based on Thumbelina
Films directed by Yûgo Serikawa